The Forbidden Woman is a 1927 American silent drama film directed by Paul L. Stein and starring Jetta Goudal, Ivan Lebedeff and Leonid Snegoff. The film is set in French North Africa.

Cast
 Jetta Goudal as Zita Gautier 
 Ivan Lebedeff as Sheik  
 Leonid Snegoff as Sultan  
 Josephine Norman as Zita's Maid  
 Victor Varconi as Col. Gautier  
 Joseph Schildkraut as Jean La Coste 
 Lassie Lou Ahern as Little Arabian Girl  
 Catherine Dale Owen

Preservation status
A surviving film at several archives, though the UCLA Film & Television only has 800 feet of a fragmentary print.

References

Bibliography
 Langman, Larry. Destination Hollywood: The Influence of Europeans on American Filmmaking. McFarland, 2000.

External links

1927 films
Silent American drama films
1927 drama films
Films directed by Paul L. Stein
American silent feature films
1920s English-language films
American black-and-white films
Pathé Exchange films
Films set in Morocco
1920s American films